This is a list of United Nations Security Council Resolutions 1 to 100 adopted between 25 January 1946 and 27 October 1953.

See also 
 Lists of United Nations Security Council resolutions
 List of United Nations Security Council Resolutions 101 to 200

0001